43 (forty-three) is the natural number following 42 and preceding 44.

In mathematics 
Forty-three is the 14th smallest prime number. The previous is forty-one, with which it comprises a twin prime, and the next is forty-seven. 43 is the smallest prime that is not a Chen prime. It is also the third Wagstaff prime.

43 is the fourth term of Sylvester's sequence, one more than the product of the previous terms (2 × 3 × 7).

43 is a centered heptagonal number.

Let a = a = 1, and thenceforth a = (a + a + ... + a). This sequence continues 1, 1, 2, 3, 5, 10, 28, 154... . a is the first term of this sequence that is not an integer.

43 is a Heegner number.

43 is the largest prime which divides the order of the Janko group J4.

43 is a repdigit in base 6 (111).

43 is the number of triangles inside the Sri Yantra.

43 is the largest natural number that is not an (original) McNugget number.

43 is the smallest prime number expressible as the sum of 2, 3, 4, or 5 different primes:
43 = 41 + 2
43 = 11 + 13 + 19
43 = 2 + 11 + 13 + 17
43 = 3 + 5 + 7 + 11 + 17.

43 is the smallest number with the property 43 = 4*prime(4) + 3*prime(3). Where prime(n) is the n-th prime number. There are only two numbers with that property, the other one is 127.

When taking the first six terms of the Taylor series for computing e, one obtains

which is also five minus the fifth harmonic number.

Every solvable configuration of the Fifteen puzzle can be solved in no more than 43 multi-tile moves (i.e. when moving two or three tiles at once is counted as one move).

In science
The chemical element with the atomic number 43 is technetium. It has the lowest atomic number of any element that does not possess stable isotopes.

Astronomy
Messier object M43, a magnitude 7.0 H II region in the constellation of Orion, a part of the Orion Nebula, and also sometimes known as de Mairan's Nebula
The New General Catalogue object NGC 43, a barred spiral galaxy in the constellation Andromeda

In sports 

In auto racing:
The number for Richard Petty's race car when he won his seven Winston Cup Championships. He also won 200 races in his career, 95% of them in the famous #43.
The maximum number of cars participating in a NASCAR race in the Cup Series until 2016, and, through the 2012 season, the Nationwide Series.

In American football:
Strong safety Troy Polamalu wore #43 for the Pittsburgh Steelers and played his entire NFL career with the team for eleven seasons (2003–2014).

Arts, entertainment, and media

Music 
The number of notes in Harry Partch's 43-tone scale of just intonation.

Popular culture 
Movie 43 (2013) is a film consisting of a series of interconnected short stories, featuring some of the biggest stars in Hollywood, which make up the insane storylines a washed-up producer is pitching to a movie company.
In The Big Bang Theory episode "The 43 Peculiarity", Howard and Raj try to solve the mystery of Sheldon disappearing every afternoon to a room with a chalkboard that has the number 43 written on it.
In the children's TV show Odd Squad, the number 43 is used as shorthand for the main villain of the first season, Odd Todd.

Literature
Number 43, in Sonnets from the Portuguese (1850), is one of Elizabeth Barrett Browning's most famous poems.

In other fields 
Forty-three is:
 +43, the code for direct dial international phone calls to Austria.
 Bush 43, George W. Bush, 43rd President of the United States.

 "43", a song by Level 42 on the album Level 42.
 "43", a song by metal band Mushroomhead on the albums Mushroomhead and XX.
  (aircraft carrier).
 The name of a popular Spanish liqueur, Cuarenta y tres, which is distilled with 43 different herbs and spices.

See also 
 List of highways numbered 43

Notes

References

 Lehmer, Derrick, List of prime numbers from 1 to 10,006,721, Carnegie Institution of Washington, 1914
 Wells, David, Prime Numbers: The Most Mysterious Figures in Math, Wiley,  2005, 
 Crandall,  Richard and Pomerance, Carl, Prime Numbers: A Computational Perspective,  Springer, 2005, 
 http://www.espncricinfo.com/south-africa-v-sri-lanka-2011/content/current/story/548918.html

Integers